Mahmoud Sakhaie was an Iranian sports shooter. He competed in two events at the 1948 Summer Olympics.

Olympic results

References

External links
 

Year of birth missing
Possibly living people
Iranian male sport shooters
Olympic shooters of Iran
Shooters at the 1948 Summer Olympics
Place of birth missing